Manzonia is a genus of minute sea snails, marine gastropod mollusks or micromollusks in the family Rissoidae.

Species
Species within the genus Manzonia include:

 Manzonia alexandrei Gofas, 2010
 Manzonia arata Gofas, 2007
 Manzonia bacalladoi Segers & Swinnen, 2002
 Manzonia boavistensis Rolán, 1987
 Manzonia boogi Moolenbeek & Faber, 1987
 Manzonia boucheti Amati, 1992
 Manzonia bravensis Rolán, 1987
 Manzonia carboverdensis Rolán, 1987
 Manzonia castanea Moolenbeek & Faber, 1987
 Manzonia crassa (Kanmacher, 1798)
 Manzonia crispa (Watson, 1873)
 Manzonia darwini Moolenbeek & Faber, 1987
 Manzonia dionisi Rolán, 1987
 Manzonia fusulus Gofas, 2007
 Manzonia geometrica Beck & Gofas, 2007
 Manzonia guitiani Rolán, 1987
 Manzonia heroensis Moolenbeek & Hoenselaar, 1992
 Manzonia insulsa Rolán, 1987
 Manzonia lusitanica Gofas, 2007
 Manzonia madeirensis Moolenbeek & Faber, 1987
 Manzonia manzoniana (Rolán, 1983)
 Manzonia overdiepi van Aartsen, 1983
 Manzonia salensis Rolán, 1987
 Manzonia segadei Rolán, 1987
 Manzonia taeniata Gofas, 2007
 Manzonia unifasciata Dautzenberg, 1889
 Manzonia vigoensis (Rolán, 1983)
 Manzonia wilmae Moolenbeek & Faber, 1987
 Manzonia xicoi Rolán, 1987

Species brought into synonymy
 Manzonia aequisculpta (Keep, 1887): synonym of Alvinia aequisculpta (Keep, 1887): synonym of Alvania aequisculpta Keep, 1887
 Manzonia almo (Bartsch, 1911): synonym of Alvania almo Bartsch, 1911
 Manzonia corruga (Laseron, 1956): synonym of Simulamerelina corruga (Laseron, 1956)
 Manzonia cosmia (Bartsch, 1911): synonym of Alvinia cosmia (Bartsch, 1911): synonym of Alvania cosmia Bartsch, 1911
 Manzonia crassula (Rehder, 1980): synonym of Simulamerelina crassula (Rehder, 1980)
 Manzonia gemmata (Powell, 1927): synonym of Simulamerelina gemmata (Powell, 1927)
 Manzonia gibbera (Watson, 1873): synonym of Madeiranzonia gibbera (Watson, 1873)
 Manzonia granulosa (Pease, 1862): synonym of Simulamerelina granulosa (Pease, 1862)
 Manzonia hewa (Kay, 1979): synonym of Simulamerelina hewa (Kay, 1979)
 Manzonia longinqua (Rehder, 1980): synonym of Simulamerelina longinqua (Rehder, 1980)
 Manzonia minuta Hornung & Mermod, 1927: synonym of Sansoniella minuta (Hornung & Mermod, 1927)
 Manzonia purpurea (Dall, 1871): synonym of Alvinia purpurea (Dall, 1871): synonym of Alvania purpurea Dall, 1871
 Manzonia tokyoensis (Pilsbry, 1904): synonym of Simulamerelina tokyoensis (Pilsbry, 1904)
 Manzonia wanawana (Kay, 1979): synonym of Simulamerelina wanawana (Kay, 1979)
 Manzonia zetlandica (Montagu, 1815): synonym of Alvinia zetlandica Montagu, 1815: synonym of Alvania zetlandica (Montagu, 1815)

References

 Vaught, K.C. (1989). A classification of the living Mollusca. American Malacologists: Melbourne, FL (USA). . XII, 195 pp. 
 Gofas, S.; Le Renard, J.; Bouchet, P. (2001). Mollusca, in: Costello, M.J. et al. (Ed.) (2001). European register of marine species: a check-list of the marine species in Europe and a bibliography of guides to their identification. Collection Patrimoines Naturels, 50: pp. 180–213
 Rolán E., 2005. Malacological Fauna From The Cape Verde Archipelago. Part 1, Polyplacophora and Gastropoda.

External links

 
Taxa named by Spiridon Brusina